Fezakinumab is a human monoclonal antibody against interleukin-22, designed for the treatment of psoriasis and rheumatoid arthritis.

Research and development

Wyeth discovered and initially developed the drug, and clinical development continued after that company was acquired by Pfizer.  Fezakinumab, in combination with methotrexate, completed a phase II trial in rheumatoid arthritis, but data were not released. A small phase II trial of fezakinumab showed significant improvement in the Scoring Atopic Dermatitis (SCORAD) score for patients with severe atopic dermatitis.

References 

Wyeth brands
Pfizer brands
Abandoned drugs